Acantheucosma is a monotypic genus of tortrix moths in subfamily Olethreutinae and tribe Olethreutini. Its sole species, Acantheucosma trachyptilla, is known from Madagascar. Both taxa were described by Alexey Diakonoff in 1988.

See also
List of Tortricidae genera

References

Olethreutini
Tortricidae genera
Monotypic moth genera
Taxa named by Alexey Diakonoff